Kovilvenni is a town near Needamangalam in the district of Thiruvarur. It is 24 km away from Thanjavur.

History
Kovilvenni was under the Chola Kingdom during the ancient period. The great battle of Venni took place between the Cholas and the Cheras here.

Battle of Venni

Battle of Venni is a battle fought by the Early Chola dynasty Karikala Chola with a confederacy of Pandya and Chera kings. The battle resulted in absolute victory for Karikala. Following his defeat, the Chera dynasty king Uthiyan Cheralathan starved himself to death. The battle is considered historical and dated approximately to 190 CE.

Educational Institutions
One of the best Engineering college in Thiruvarur district, the Anjalai Ammal Mahalingam Engineering College is in Kovilvenni. St.Marcinas Higher Secondary school is a school in Kovilvenni.

References

Cities and towns in Tiruvarur district